United in Hope (BBY) is a political coalition in Senegal led by President Macky Sall's Alliance for the Republic party. The coalition managed to obtain a majority in the National Assembly both in the 2012 and the 2017 election. Following the 2022 election the coalition fell one seat short of the majority, but still managed to form a minority government thanks to the support to Pape Diop, the only MP elected from Bokk Gis Gis. However on 25 September 2022 Aminata Touré, who lead the 2022 electoral campaign, announced she would no longer sit with BBY in the Assembly, accusing President Sall of promoting Amadou Mame Diop as president of the National Assembly due to "familial ties", meaning that the government lost its majority in the chamber.

Composition
The coalition is composed of the following parties:

Electoral history

National Assembly elections

References

Political parties in Senegal
Elections in Senegal
Political party alliances in Senegal